The 1980–81 Irish Cup was the 101st edition of Northern Ireland's premier football knock-out cup competition. It began on 31 January 1981, and concluded on 2 May 1981 with the final.

The defending champions were Linfield who won the cup for the 32nd time the previous season, defeating Crusaders 2–0 in the 1979–80 final. They reached the semi-finals this time, where they were defeated 1–0 by Glenavon. Ballymena United won the cup for the third time (fourth time if you include Ballymena's record), defeating Glenavon 1–0 in the final.

Results

First round

|}

1These ties required a replay, after the first games ended as 0–0 draws.
2This tie required a replay, after the first game ended as 1–1 draw.

Quarter-finals

|}

Semi-finals

|}

3This tie required a replay, after the first game ended as a 2–2 draw.

Final

References

Irish Cup seasons
2
Northern Ireland